A Service award was awarded by a country to a soldier or civilian for long service.  It is comparable to a service medal but can be awarded to civilians as well as soldiers.

Germany

Kingdom of Bavaria
Königliches Ludwigsorden for 50 years' service.
Service Award Cross, first and second class for 40 or 24 years' service - officers, doctors and officials received the cross of both classes, but teams were also awarded first class.

Nazi Germany
The Nazi Party (NSDAP) awarded the NSDAP-Dienstauszeichnung (Nazi Party Long Service Award) for 25  (Gold), 15 (Silver) and 10 (Bronze) years' service, while the SS awarded a separate SS-Dienstauszeichnung for 4, 8, 12 and 25 years of service.

The Wehrmacht awarded the 4-class Dienstauszeichnung for 4 (silver medal); 12 (gold medal); 18 (silver cross) and 25 (gold cross) years' service, with oak leaves on the first class for 40 years.

Similarly there was a Loyal Service Medal for active members of the German police or "an administrator" in the police service known as the Polizei Dienstauszeichnung. In addition there was a Service Award for Public Work.

Austrian Empire
From 1849 it awarded a cross made out of cannon-metal for military service.

Sources

Military history of Austria
Orders, decorations, and medals of Germany
Orders, decorations, and medals of the German Empire
Orders, decorations, and medals of Nazi Germany